"On the Alamo" is a 1922 composition by Isham Jones, with lyrics by Gus Kahn (under the nom-de-guerre of Gilbert Keyes) and Joe Lyons. Jones and his Orchestra recorded it at Brunswick Studios in New York City in February without a vocalist, as was his custom at the time, and it was released as the b-side of "By the Sapphire Sea" on Brunswick 2245 in April.

On March 17, a copyright was filed by Tell Taylor, Inc., of Chicago, Illinois, possibly the last song published by William 'Tell' Taylor, who sold his business to Forster Music Publisher, Inc., and retired to Ohio, where he bought a home for his parents. Unfortunately, 'Sapphire Sea' failed to make the charts, but by mid-Summer, 'On the Alamo' hit number 1 for four weeks., and finished as the 7th highest ranking single for 1922.

Notable versions

78 RPM
Isham Jones Orchestra - Brunswick 2245 (B-side of "By the Sapphire Sea"), April 1922
Benson Orchestra of Chicago - Victor 18931-B (B-side of "Don't Bring Me Posies"), September 1922
Rudy Vallée and his Connecticut Yankees - Victor 22084 (B-side of "Do You Love Me?"), 1929
Benny Goodman, featuring Art Lund - Columbia 36988, 1946 (B-side was "Rattle and Roll")

LP
Jo Stafford - Starring Jo Stafford, 1953
Dave Brubeck - Dave Brubeck at Storyville: 1954 / Vol. 1, 1954
Toots Thielemans - The Sound: The Amazing Jean "Toots" Thielemans, 1955
Stan Getz - Split Kick, 1955
Tal Farlow - A Recital by Tal Farlow, 1955
Oscar Peterson - Nostalgic Memories, recorded 1949–51, released on LP, 1956 (re-issued on CD in 2009 as Debut: The Clef/Mercury Duo Recordings 1949-1951)
Bing Crosby - New Tricks, 1957 (reissued on LP in 1964 as Songs Everybody Knows, and on CD in 1998 in Some Fine Old Chestnuts and New Tricks, and in 2009 in The Bing Crosby CBS Radio Recordings: 1954-56)
Ted Heath and His Music - Ted Heath's First American Tour, 1957
Thad Jones - Keeping Up With the Joneses: featuring The Jones Brothers - playing the music of Thad Jones and Isham Jones, 1958, with brothers Thad, Hank and Elvin Jones, as well as bassist Eddie Jones (unrelated) (re-issued in 1999 by Verve as Keeping Up With the Joneses)
The Al Cohn-Zoot Sims Quintet - You 'n Me, 1960 (re-issued by Polygram in 1981, and on CD by Verve in 2002)
Betty Carter - The Modern Sound of Betty Carter, recorded August 19, 1960, released 1961 (re-issued in 1976 on Impulse Records as part of the 2-record set, What a Little Moonlight Can Do, and in 1992 by GRP as part of the CD I Can't Help It, and in 2012 by American Jazz Classics as part of the CD, The Modern Sound of Betty Carter / Out There)"I Can't Help It". WorldCat. Retrieved 2013-02-16.<ref>[http://www.worldcat.org/oclc/794046633 "The Modern Sound of Betty Carter / Out There]. WorldCat. Retrieved 2013-02-17.</ref>
The Hi-Lo's - This Time It's Love, 1962 (re-issued in 2003 by Sony Music Entertainment as part of the CD This Time It's Love - plus 14 Bonus Tracks)
The Art Van Damme Quintet - Blue World, 1970, with Joe Pass and Eberhard Weber  (re-issued in 1995 by MPS Records as part of the CD Two Originals: Keep Going, Blue World)
Bing Crosby - A Southern Memoir, 1975 (reissued on CD in 2010)
Zoot Sims - The Swinger, 1981 (re-issued on CD by Pablo Records in 1995, and as streaming audio by Naxos Music Library in 2008, as The Swingers)

References

1922 songs
Songs with music by Isham Jones
Bing Crosby songs
Jo Stafford songs